Ronald Frederick Silver (September 22, 1907 – July 30, 1993) was a Canadian ice hockey player.

Silver was a member of the Saskatoon Quakers who represented Canada at the 1934 World Ice Hockey Championships held in Milan, Italy where they won Gold.

References

Canadian ice hockey defencemen
Saskatoon Quakers players
1907 births
1993 deaths